The Matt-Bahls House is a historic building located in Guttenberg, Iowa, United States.  The two-story vernacular stone structure was built sometime before 1858.  It features a full-length, two-story, frame porch on its south side.  The single-story frame addition on the northeast side blends into the older structure.  The building was listed on the National Register of Historic Places in 1984.

References

Vernacular architecture in Iowa
Houses in Guttenberg, Iowa
Houses on the National Register of Historic Places in Iowa
National Register of Historic Places in Clayton County, Iowa